Albert Schnez (30 August 1911 – 26 April 2007) was an officer in three successive German armies: the Reichswehr, the Wehrmacht, and finally the Bundeswehr, the armed forces of the modern Federal Republic of Germany.  He was involved in the debate on the internal leadership of the newly formed Bundeswehr and was close to the German defense minister, Franz Josef Strauss. Schnez served from 1968 to 1971 with the rank of lieutenant-general (Generalleutnant) as the Inspector of the Army.

From 1949, Schnez, together with other veterans of the Wehrmacht and Waffen-SS, built a clandestine shadow army, the "Schnez-Truppe", that intended to fight against the Soviet Union in the event of an invasion. By 1951, Chancellor Konrad Adenauer had learned of the existence of this secret army and its head Schnez, but evidently declined to act against them.

References 

1911 births
2007 deaths
People from Ostalbkreis
People from the Kingdom of Württemberg
Reichswehr personnel
German Army officers of World War II
Bundeswehr generals
Recipients of the Gold German Cross
Lieutenant generals of the German Army
Knights Commander of the Order of Merit of the Federal Republic of Germany
Military personnel from Baden-Württemberg